The Haier Q8 T20 CUP 2015–2016 is the Twelve season of the National T20 Cup in Pakistan, sponsored by Haier.The qualifying round of the event commences on Sept. 1 and runs up to Sept. 5, 2015. Eight Teams will participate in qualifying round. The Winner of both semi-finals of qualifying round shall make it to the main round.

Twelve teams will contest for Cool & Cool Presents Haier Mobile T20 CUP 2015–2016 in the main tournament. The main tournament will commence on Sept. 8 and its semifinals will be played on Sept 14 and the final took place on September 15.

Venue

Teams

Tournament
The tournament was held between 1 and 15 September 2015. Tournament is a Qualifying Round, Round Robin and Knockout tournament.

Qualifying round

Qualifying Group A 

 Fixtures and Results

Qualifying Group B

Fixtures and Results

Semi-finals

Main Round

Group A 

Fixtures and Results

Group B 

Fixtures and Results

Knockout stage

Semi-finals

Final

References

2015–16 National T20 Cup
2015 in Pakistani cricket
2016 in Pakistani cricket
Domestic cricket competitions in 2015–16
Pakistani cricket seasons from 2000–01
September 2016 sports events in Pakistan